Shuravash-e Sofla (also Romanized as Shūravāsh-e Soflá) is a village in Bazan Rural District, in the Central District of Javanrud County, Kermanshah Province, Iran. At the 2006 census, its population was 24, in 6 families.

References 

Populated places in Javanrud County